Ann Mooney (born 14 April 1975) is a Papua New Guinean sprinter. She competed in the women's 400 metres at the 2000 Summer Olympics.

References

External links

1975 births
Living people
Athletes (track and field) at the 2000 Summer Olympics
Papua New Guinean female sprinters
Olympic athletes of Papua New Guinea
World Athletics Championships athletes for Papua New Guinea
Place of birth missing (living people)
Olympic female sprinters